Pyticeroides is a genus of checkered beetles in the family Cleridae. There are about nine described species in Pyticeroides.

Species
These nine species belong to the genus Pyticeroides:
 Pyticeroides decurialis Opitz, 2007
 Pyticeroides eurides Opitz, 2007
 Pyticeroides fustis Opitz, 2007
 Pyticeroides iscus Opitz, 2007
 Pyticeroides laticornis (Say, 1835) (broad-horned clerid)
 Pyticeroides manni Chapin, 1927
 Pyticeroides moraguesi Opitz, 2010
 Pyticeroides pullis Opitz, 2010
 Pyticeroides similis Opitz, 2007

References

Further reading

 
 

Cleridae
Articles created by Qbugbot